Battle or Battles are surnames that may refer to:

Albrey Battle (born 1976), American football player
Allen Battle (born 1968), American baseball player
Arnaz Battle (born 1980), American football player
Ashley Battle (born 1982), American basketball player
Cliff Battles (1910–1981), American football player
Cormac Battle (born 1972), Irish musician and radio presenter
Edgar Battle (born 1907), American jazz performer, composer and arranger
Greg Battle (born 1964), Canadian football player
Helen Battle (1903–1994), Canadian marine biologist 
Hinton Battle (born 1956), American actor, dancer, and dance instructor
Howard Battle (born 1972), American baseball player
Jackie Battle (born 1983), American football player
Jim Battle (baseball) (1901–1965), American baseball player
John Battle (basketball) (born 1962), American basketball player 
John Battle (politician) (born 1951), British politician
John S. Battle (1890–1972), American politician and Governor of Virginia
Jordan Battle (born 2000), American football player
José Miguel Battle Sr. (1929–2007), American mobster
Joseph F. Battle Jr. (1937-2001), American politician and judge
Kathleen Battle (born 1948), American soprano
Kemp P. Battle (1831–1919), American politician and historian
Kenny Battle (born 1964), American basketball player
Lucius D. Battle (1918–2008), American diplomat
Mike Battle (born 1946), American football player
Pat Battle (born 1959), American television journalist
Ron Battle (born 1959), American football player
Simone Battle (1989–2014), American actress and singer
Tara Cross-Battle (born 1968), American volleyball player
Texas Battle (born 1980), American actor
Tyus Battle (born 1997), American basketball player
Vincent M. Battle (born 1940), American diplomat
William C. Battle (1920–2008), American diplomat

See also
Battle (disambiguation)
Batlle